Dan Metelsky was a member of the Ohio House of Representatives from 1996 to 2001. His district consisted of a portion of Lorain County, Ohio. He was succeeded by Joseph Koziura.

Before being elected to the Ohio House of Representatives Metelsky had been a city councilman for 12 in Lorain. After stepping down from the House in 2001 Metelsky held a post at the Ohio Lottery Commission from 2001 to 2008.

References

Members of the Ohio House of Representatives
Living people
21st-century American politicians
Year of birth missing (living people)
People from Lorain, Ohio
20th-century American politicians